The volleyball competition at the 1997 Pan Arab Games was held in November in Beirut. Egypt beat Algeria in the final to win the gold medal but Egypt was disqualified because doping of some players. The Saudi Arabia team won the second place and Kuwait third place.

Men's tournament

Group A

 1st day
 Algeria 3-1 Bahrain
 Egypt 3-1 Qatar

 2nd day
 Algeria 3-1 Egypt
 Bahrain 3-0 Qatar

 3rd day
 Algeria 3-0 Qatar
 Egypt 3-0 Bahrain

Group B

 1st day
 Saudi Arabia 3-0 Kuwait
 Lebanon 3-0 Libya

 2nd day
 Saudi Arabia 3-0 Libya
 Kuwait 3-2 Lebanon

 3rd day
 Kuwait 3-0 Libya
 Saudi Arabia 3-2 Lebanon

Knock-out stage

Semifinals
 Algeria - Kuwait
 Egypt - Saudi Arabia

The Final
 Egypt 3-0 Algeria
 (Egypt disqualify because doping of players)

7th-8th Places
 Qatar 3-0 Libya

5th-6th Places
 Bahrain 3-2 Lebanon

The 3rd/4th Place
 Saudi Arabia 3-1 Kuwait

Women's tournament

 1st day
 Algeria 3-0 Lebanon
 Egypt 3-0 Morocco
 2nd day
 Morocco 3-0 Lebanon
 Egypt 3-1 Algeria
 3rd day
 Egypt 3-0 Lebanon
 Algeria 3-0 Morocco

References
  Pan Arab Games 1997 - Volleyball

Pan Arab Games
1997
Volleyball
1997 Pan Arab Games